Stonelick State Park is a public recreation area located off Ohio State Route 727,  east of central Cincinnati, in Wayne Township, Clermont County, Ohio, United States. Park activities include fishing, hunting, hiking, picnicking, swimming, boating, and camping.

History 
The land for the park was acquired in 1948, and a dam at the west side of the lake was completed in 1950, which created the lake. Since the park's inception, there was a wastewater leak that damaged the ecology of the lake. The lake was dredged in the 1990s to restore the contamination levels of the lake to those that are safe for wildlife and swimming.

References

External links
Stonelick State Park Ohio Department of Natural Resources 
Stonelick State Park Map Ohio Department of Natural Resources 

State parks of Ohio
Protected areas of Clermont County, Ohio
Protected areas established in 1948
1948 establishments in Ohio